The finals and the qualifying heats of the Men's 200 metres Freestyle event at the 1993 FINA Short Course World Championships were held in Palma de Mallorca, Spain.

Finals

Qualifying heats

See also
1992 Men's Olympic Games 200m Freestyle
1993 Men's European LC Championships 200m Freestyle

References
 Results
 swimrankings

F